Rohan Mehra (born 8 April 1990) is an Indian actor who works in Indian television, Bollywood films and web series. He is known for his roles in Indian TV shows like Yeh Rishta Kya Kehlata Hai as Naksh Singhania, Sasural Simar Ka as Sameer Kapoor, he was also a contestant on the reality TV show Bigg Boss 10.

Career

Initial career days (2009–15) 

Mehra began his Modelling career in 2009 and has done more than 200 tv commercials and print ads. He began his acting career in Indian television industry through an episodic of Channel V India's crime drama Gumrah: End of Innocence in 2012.

In 2013, he appeared as Varun Ashwin Khanna in Sony Entertainment Television popular TV show Bade Achhe Lagte Hain. Mehra also made his Bollywood debut with the erotic thriller film Sixteen wherein he played Kartik.

In 2014, he did two episodic roles in the TV series Yeh Hai Aashiqui and Webbed 2 as Amar and Ravi. His second Bollywood film Uvaa was released in 2015 wherein he worked as Anil Sharma.

Breakthrough and Bigg Boss (2015–17)

In 2015, Mehra found his first major success portraying Naksh Singhania in Star Plus longest-running soap opera Yeh Rishta Kya Kehlata Hai which won him the Gold Award for Best Debut Actor (Male). He quit the show in September 2016 to participate in Bigg Boss.

In October 2016, he entered as a celebrity contestant in the 10th season of the Indian popular reality game show Bigg Boss. He got eliminated on Day 102 in January 2017 and was placed 5th.

Sasural Simar Ka and beyond (2017–present)

From June 2017 to March 2018, Mehra starred in Colors TV's long running daily soap Sasural Simar Ka as Sameer Kapoor opposite Krissann Barretto and Vaishali Takkar. His character was initially negative, before it slowly turned positive.

In 2018, he signed his fourth episodic role in &TV's Laal Ishq as Rohan. The same year, he was playing in Lucknow Nawabs as a contestant in the third season of Box Cricket League and became the winner.

A year later, Mehra was a contestant in Kitchen Champion with Kanchi Singh. In 2020, he debuted into web series with ALT Balaji teen drama Class of 2020 that featured him as Ibrahim Noorani.

In February 2021, his second web series Crashh began streaming online on ALTBalaji and ZEE5 that co-starred Zain Imam, Aditi Sharma, Kunj Anand and Anushka Sen.

Filmography

Films

Television

Web series

Music videos

Awards and nominations

References

External links

 
 
 

21st-century Indian male actors
Living people
Punjabi people
Place of birth missing (living people)
Indian male film actors
Indian male soap opera actors
1990 births